The 1880 United States presidential election in Colorado took place on November 2, 1880, as part of the 1880 United States presidential election. Voters chose three representatives, or electors to the Electoral College, who voted for president and vice president.

Colorado voted for the Republican nominee, James A. Garfield, over the Democratic nominee, Winfield Scott Hancock. Garfield won the state by a margin of 5.23 points. Before Populist candidate James Weaver's 1892 victory transitioned the state into being Democratic-leaning, this was the closest a Democrat came to winning the state. Additionally, it was the only time a Democrat won any counties other than Las Animas, Bent, and Huerfano until 1896.

Hancock's strength was part of a brief surge for Democrats in the Rocky Mountains and Pacific: Democrats captured California for the first time since 1856, Nevada for the first time ever, and fell only 1.63% short in Oregon. This surge can largely be attributed to a letter attributed to Garfield, first printed in a New York newspaper named Truth, that declared Garfield was in favor of allowing Chinese immigration for its cheap labor. Despite the fact that it was a blatant falsehood, it cost Republicans in the west where Chinese immigrants were often accused of stealing jobs from American laborers.

Results

Results by county

References

Colorado
1880
1880 Colorado elections